Premalekha is a 1952 Indian Malayalam-language film, directed by M. K. Ramani. The film stars Jose Prakash and S. P. Pillai. The film's score was composed by P. S. Divakar.

Cast
 Jose Prakash
 S. P. Pillai
 Omalloor Chellamma
 Adoor Pankajam
 Ambalappuzha Meenakshi
 S. R. Pallatt
 Chitoor Madhavankutty Menon
 V D Mathew
 Vanakkutty

References

External links
 

1950s Malayalam-language films